RTCN Suwałki (Krzemianucha) is a  tall guyed mast for FM and TV situated at Jeleniewo near Suwałki in Podlaskie Voivodeship, Poland.

It is also known as Krzemianucha Transmitter or Transmitter Jeleniewo or Broadcasting Transmitting Centre at the Krzemianucha Hill (not to get mixed up over Krzemieniucha).

Major Transmitters
The licensed transmitters at this location are:

See also

 List of masts

References

 http://emi.emitel.pl/EMITEL/obiekty.aspx?obiekt=DODR_E1H
 http://radiopolska.pl/wykaz/pokaz_lokalizacja.php?pid=100
 http://www.przelaczenie.eu/mapy/podlaskie
 http://www.dvbtmap.eu/mapcoverage.html?chid=9660

Radio masts and towers in Poland
Suwałki County
Buildings and structures in Podlaskie Voivodeship